A Walnut Whip is a whirl-shaped cone of milk chocolate with a whipped vanilla fondant filling, topped with a half-walnut.

Origin
Launched in 1910 by Duncan's of Edinburgh, Walnut Whip is Nestlé Rowntree's oldest current brand. Over one million walnuts, most of them imported from China and India, are used every week in the manufacture of Walnut Whips at Halifax, West Yorkshire. Nestlé claim that almost one Walnut Whip is eaten every two seconds in the UK.

Variations
Originally manufactured by Duncan's of Edinburgh in their Beaverhall Road factory, there have been a number of flavours of Walnut Whip over the years, including coffee and maple flavours, but currently only vanilla is widely available.

The original Walnut Whip contained a half-walnut, or more usually walnuts that had been broken during handling and transportation and were therefore not suitable to be placed on the top. It was later marketed with an extra walnut on top, and subsequently the walnut inside was removed to leave one walnut outside.

The chocolate cone itself and the vanilla fondant filling have altered in recent years. The original whips were hand made by extruding chocolate from a piping bag onto a rubber mould, each containing 12 'formers'. This generated the original deeply ridged surface, and the fondant at that time was more dense. The texture of the outside surface is a skeuomorph.

When the Duncan's brand name was dispensed with by Rowntree's and manufacturing moved from Beaverhall Road in the late 1970s, the manufacturing process changed from being hand made to being hollow moulded by machine. An attempt was made to recreate the original surface appearance but with limited success, and it now has no function other than decoration.

In 2017, Nestlé announced a new version with no walnuts, and a change of name to the Whip. As of 2020 Mint and Caramel versions are also available. Nestlé is expanding the range of its iconic whirl-shaped cone, Walnut Whip and launching new variants of Nestlé Whip: Delicate Vanilla, Delicious Caramel and Delightful Mint to offer more choice with and without the walnut. The original Walnut Whip is still available in Spar, Nisa and other independent stores.

In popular culture
Ken Livingstone famously said the London 2012 Summer Olympics will cost Londoners 38p per week (the price of a Walnut Whip)

References

External links
 

Brand name chocolate
Rowntree's brands
Walnut dishes